Angels & Devils is the fourth studio album by English musician Kevin Martin under his alias The Bug. It was released in August 2014 under Ninja Tune. It peaked at number 50 on the Billboard Heatseekers Albums chart.

Critical reception

At Metacritic, which assigns a weighted average score out of 100 to reviews from mainstream critics, Angels & Devils received an average score of 83, based on 19 reviews, indicating "universal acclaim".

It was placed at number 20 on Facts "50 Best Albums of 2014" list, as well as number 18 on Rolling Stones "20 Best EDM, Electronic and Dance Albums of 2014" list.

Track listing

Charts

References

External links
 

2014 albums
Ninja Tune albums
Kevin Martin (British musician) albums